Cryptolechia trimaculata is a moth in the family Depressariidae. It was described by Wang in 2006. It is found in Fujian, China.

The length of the forewings is about 15 mm. The forewings are brown, with a dark brown dot at the middle of the cell, the end of the cell and the distal one-third of the fold. There is a yellow spot set on the costa halfway and at one-fifth, while another yellow spot is situated at two-thirds the length of the dorsum. The hindwings are grey.

Etymology
The specific name refers to the forewing pattern and is derived from Latin trimaculatus (meaning having three spots).

References

Moths described in 2006
Cryptolechia (moth)